Alula was an ornithological magazine published in Turku, Finland. The magazine was published on a quarterly basis. Initially it was published in both Finnish and English, but the final volumes were published in English only. It was aimed primarily at birders with an interest in the birds of the Western Palearctic. The final issue of Alula was issued in 2008 (volume 14, issue 3) after which printing ceased in 2009 due to financial problems.

See also
List of ornithology journals

References

External links
 Official website (archived version)
 Index of Alula articles

1995 establishments in Finland
2008 disestablishments in Finland
Defunct magazines published in Finland
English-language magazines
Finnish-language magazines
Journals and magazines relating to birding and ornithology
Magazines established in 1995
Magazines disestablished in 2008
Mass media in Turku
Quarterly magazines published in Finland